Long Beach Bus is a public transportation system serving Greater Long Beach on the south shore of Long Island, New York.  The service operates twenty-four hours a day, with five different routes connecting to one another and to Nassau Inter-County Express and Long Island Rail Road at Long Beach station in the city center. Although Long Beach Bus is designed to complement county bus and commuter rail service, it is run independently by Long Beach DOT.

Service overview
The service operates 24-hours a day, except early Monday mornings. The service operates five routes, with two regular services within the city, one extended route to the Long Beach's eastern suburbs, one tourist trolley line and one overnight circulator. Viability of such an extensive service in a suburban setting is made possible by Long Beach's high-density layout: due to the limited supply of land on the island, fewer than 40% of homes are detached houses, making Long Beach one of the twenty-five densest cities in the country, just behind San Francisco but ahead of Jersey City. The service also plays an important role in transporting the many tourists who arrive in the summer by train from New York City.

Because it is owned and operated independently by the City of Long Beach, and not by Nassau County, Long Beach Bus was unaffected by the 2012 privatization of Long Island Bus.  

Most service information is provided bilingually in both English and American Spanish.

Bus routes 
Long Beach Bus operates five bus routes within the City and to Lido Beach and Point Lookout, all originating from the Long Beach LIRR station. The fare for all routes is $2.25, except for the Point Lookout service, which has a $2.75 base fare.

In accordance with the Americans with Disabilities Act, paratransit service is offered to those unable to utilize traditional buses.

References

External links
Long Beach Department of Transportation, City of Long Beach (longbeachny.org)
Schedule
Nassau/Suffolk Transit Map (unofficial)

Surface transportation in Greater New York
Transportation in Nassau County, New York
Bus transportation in New York (state)
Buses